Ceroxylon ventricosum, also known as the Ecuadorian wax palm is a species of Ceroxylon from Colombia and Ecuador.

References

External links
 
 

ventricosum
Taxa named by Max Burret